Chestnut Ridge Park is a  park in Orchard Park, New York, originally named for the chestnut trees on its hills. It is currently the largest park operated by the Erie County Department of Parks, Recreation and Forestry, and is open year-round. 

The Chestnut Ridge Park property was acquired by Erie County in 1926, and it was one of the first parks established by the county. The park's facilities and landscapes were improved substantially by the Works Progress Administration throughout the 1930s.

Facilities and attractions
 The park has facilities and space for tennis, hiking, disc golf, snowmobiling, sledding and other outdoor activities.
 The Buffalo Philharmonic Orchestra has held summer concerts at the base of the sledding hill, which provides an amphitheater-like setting.
 On a clear day, the sledding hill offers views of Buffalo and Lake Erie. Toboggan chutes also operate on the sled hill during the winter.
 The Eternal Flame Falls, a small waterfall containing a natural "eternal flame," is located within the park. The falls are situated within what was once known as the Shale Creek Preserve, a wilderness area formerly owned by the Buffalo Museum of Science.
 A tower facility used for firefighter training is located on the premises.

Although said to be one of the largest county parks in the United States, at least one larger county park is located nearby.

Gallery

References

External links
 Map of Chestnut Ridge Park
 Chestnut Ridge Conservancy
 Chestnut Ridge Park on Western New York Outdoors

Parks in Erie County, New York